Qeshlaq-e Hajj Abish Hajj Mosum (also Romanized as Qeshlāq-e Ḩājj Ābīsh Ḩājj Moʿṣūm) is a village in Qeshlaq-e Sharqi Rural District, Qeshlaq Dasht District, Bileh Savar County, Ardabil Province, Iran. At the 2006 census, its population was 51, in 11 families.

References 

Populated places in Bileh Savar County
Towns and villages in Bileh Savar County